The 2014 ToyotaCare 250 was the eighth stock car race of the 2014 NASCAR Nationwide Series season, and the 27th iteration of the event. The race was held on Friday, April 25, 2014, in Richmond, Virginia at Richmond Raceway, a 0.75 miles (1.21 km) D-shaped oval. The race took the scheduled 250 laps to complete. At race's end, JR Motorsports driver Kevin Harvick would manage to dominate the race to win his seventh career NASCAR Nationwide Series victory and his first of the season. To fill out the podium, Chase Elliott, driving for JR Motorsports, and Kyle Busch, driving for Joe Gibbs Racing, would finish second and third, respectively.

Background 

Richmond International Raceway (RIR) is a 3/4-mile (1.2 km), D-shaped, asphalt race track located just outside Richmond, Virginia in Henrico County. It hosts the Monster Energy NASCAR Cup Series and Xfinity Series. Known as "America's premier short track", it formerly hosted a NASCAR Camping World Truck Series race, an IndyCar Series race, and two USAC sprint car races.

Entry list 

 (R) denotes rookie driver.
 (i) denotes driver who is ineligible for series driver points.

Practice

First practice 
The first practice session was held on Thursday, April 24, at 1:00 PM EST. The session would last for one hour.

Final practice 
The final practice session, sometimes known as Happy Hour, was held on Thursday, April 24, at 2:30 PM EST. The session would last for one hour and 30 minutes.

Qualifying 
Qualifying was held on Friday, April 25, at 3:10 PM EST. Since Richmond International Raceway is under  in length, the qualifying system was a multi-car system that included two rounds. The first round was 30 minutes, where every driver would be able to set a lap within the 30 minutes. Then, the second round would consist of the fastest 12 drivers in round 1, and drivers would have 10 minutes to set a time. Whoever set the fastest time in round 2 would win the pole.

No drivers would fail to qualify.

Full qualifying results 

*Time not available.

Race results

Standings after the race 

Drivers' Championship standings

Note: Only the first 10 positions are included for the driver standings.

References 

2014 NASCAR Nationwide Series
NASCAR races at Richmond Raceway
April 2014 sports events in the United States
2014 in sports in Virginia